Richard Danielpour (born January 28, 1956) is an American composer.

Early life
Danielpour was born in New York City of Persian Jewish descent and grew up in New York City and West Palm Beach, Florida. He studied at Oberlin College and the New England Conservatory of Music, and later at the Juilliard School of Music, where he received a DMA in composition in 1986. His primary composition professors at Juilliard were Vincent Persichetti and Peter Mennin. Danielpour previously taught at the Manhattan School of Music (since 1993) and the Curtis Institute of Music (since 1997), and is currently on the faculty at the University of California, Los Angeles.

Music
In common with many other American composers of the post-war generation, Danielpour began his career in a serialist milieu, but rejected it in the late 1980s in favor of a more ecumenical and "accessible" idiom. He cites the Beatles—along with John Adams, Christopher Rouse, and Joseph Schwantner—as influences on his more recent musical style. Danielpour's notable works include First Light (1988) for chamber orchestra, three symphonies (1985, 1986, and 1990), four piano concerti (1981, 1993, 2002 and 2009), the ballet Anima mundi (1995), and the opera Margaret Garner (2005).

His students include Marcus Paus and Wang Jie.

Select list of works

Operas

 Margaret Garner (2005)
Libretto by Toni Morrison

Ballets

 Anima Mundi (1995)
 For the Pacific Northwest Ballet
 Urban Dances (1996)
 For the New York City Ballet and choreographer Miriam Mataviani

Orchestral

 Oratio Pauli (1982), for S.A.T.B. choir & string orchestra
 Symphony No. 1 – Dona Nobis Pacem (1984)
 Symphony No. 2 – Visions (1986), for soprano, tenor & orchestra
 First Light (1988)
 Cello Concerto No. 1 (1990), for cello & orchestra
 Piano Concerto No. 1 – Metamorphosis (1990), for piano & orchestra
 The Awakened Heart (1990)
 Symphony No. 3 – Journey Without Distance (1990), for soprano, S.A.T.B. choir & orchestra
 Song of Remembrance (1991)
 Toward the Splendid City (1992)
 commissioned by the New York Philharmonic
 Piano Concerto No. 2 (1993), for piano & orchestra
 Anima Mundi (1995)
 commissioned by the Pacific Northwest Ballet; choreographed by Kent Stowell.
 premièred in Seattle, WA on 6th February 1996, Stewart Kershaw conducting.
 Canticle of Peace (1995), for baritone, S.A.T.B. choir & chamber orchestra
 Concerto for Orchestra – Zoroastrian Riddles (1996)
 Urban Dances (Dance Suite in Five Movements (1996)
 Celestial Night (1997)
 Elegies (1997), song-cycle for mezzo-soprano, baritone & orchestra
 Vox Populi (1998)
 A Fool's Paradise (1999), concerto for violin & orchestra
 commissioned to celebrate the 100th anniversary of Yaddo's collaboration with the Philadelphia Orchestra; written for violinist Chantal Juillet and the Philadelphia Orchestra, who premièred the work under Charles Dutoit at the Saratoga Center, NY in August 2000.
 The Night Rainbow (1999)
 A Child's Reliquary (2000), double concerto for violin, cello & orchestra
 Nocturne (2000), for string orchestra
 An American Requiem (2001), for mezzo-soprano, tenor, baritone soli, S.A.T.B. choir & orchestra
 Cello Concerto No. 2 – Through the Ancient Valley (2001), for cello solo, kamancheh soloists & orchestra
 commissioned by the New York Philharmonic for cellist Yo-Yo Ma, who premièred the work under Kurt Masur at Avery Fisher Hall, New York City on March 14, 2001.
 In the Arms of the Beloved (2001), double concerto for violin, cello & orchestra
 commissioned to celebrate the 25th wedding anniversary of Jaime Laredo (violinist) and Sharon Robinson (cellist), who premièred the work with the IRIS Chamber Orchestra under Michael Stern in Germantown, TN on April 20, 2002.
 From the Mountaintop (2001), concerto for clarinet and orchestra
 Piano Concerto No. 3 – Zodiac Variations (2002), for piano left-hand & orchestra
 commissioned by Herbert R. Axelrod for pianist Gary Graffman, who gave the work's première with the National Symphony Orchestra under Leonard Slatkin at the Kennedy Center, Washington, D.C. on April 4, 2002.
 Apparitions (2003), for chamber orchestra
 commissioned by the New Jersey Symphony, who premièred the work under Zdenek Macal at the New Jersey Performing Arts Center, Newark, NJ on May 14, 2003.
 Swan Song (2003), for string orchestra
 an arrangement of the third movement of Danielpour's String Quartet No. 4 – Apparitions Songs of Solitude (2004), song-cycle for baritone & orchestra
 written for baritone Thomas Hampson, commissioned by the Philadelphia Orchestra, who premièred the work under David Robertson in Philadelphia, Pennsylvania on October 21, 2004.
 Adagietto (2005), for string orchestra
 commissioned by the Wheeling Jesuit University for the Wheeling Symphony, who premièred the work (as part of the Wheeling Jesuit University's 50th anniversary celebrations) under André Raphael Smith in Wheeling, WV, on March 11, 2005.
 Voice of the City (2005), for concert band
 Washington Speaks (2005), for narrator & orchestra
 commissioned by the Knights of Columbus for the Orchestra of St. Luke's, who premièred the work under Sir Gilbert Levine with Ted Koppel as narrator at the Basilica of the National Shrine of the Immaculate Conception, Washington, D.C. on November 14, 2007.
 Pastime (2006), song-cycle for baritone & orchestra
 co-commissioned by the Pittsburgh Symphony, the Atlanta Symphony, and the Brooklyn Philharmonic in celebration of the 2006 Major League Baseball All-Star Game on 10 July 2006.
 Triptych (2006), for soprano & orchestra
 three arias from Danielpour's 2005 opera Margaret Garner; commissioned by the Wheeling Symphony, who premièred the work with soprano soloist Tracie Luck and André Raphael Smith conducting in Wheeling, WV on May 19, 2006.
 Voices of Remembrance (2006), concerto for string quartet & orchestra
 commissioned by the National Symphony Orchestra, Washington, D.C.
 A Woman's Life (2007), for soprano & orchestra
 commissioned by the Pittsburgh Symphony and the Philadelphia Orchestra; premièred by soprano Angela Brown with the Pittsburgh Symphony under Leonard Slatkin on October 16, 2009 in Pittsburgh, PA.
 Rocking the Cradle (2007)
 commissioned by the Baltimore Symphony, who premièred the work under Juanjo Mena on March 22, 2007 in Baltimore, MD.
 Three Prayers (2007), for soprano & orchestra
 excerpted from Danielpour's opera Margaret Garner
 Souvenirs (2008), for chamber orchestra
 commissioned by the Kravis Center for the Vienna Chamber Orchestra, who premièred the work under Philippe Entremont in Vienna, 2008.
 Kaddish (2008), rewritten for violin solo and orchestra
 commissioned by the New Jersey Symphony Orchestra, with soloist Gil Shaham.
 Vox Terrae (2008), for orchestra (G.Shirmer/A.M.P.)
 Commissioned by the Lancaster Symphony
 Lacrimae Beati (2009), for string orchestra
 commissioned by the Sejong Soloists, who premièred the work at Alice Tully Hall, New York in December 2009.
 Icarus (2009), for large brass ensemble, seven percussion & two pianos
 commissioned by a consortium of eighteen US universities, premièred by the Indiana University of Pennsylvania "Keystone Brass Ensemble" at the WASBE International Conference in July 2010. A further performance was given by the Pittsburgh Symphony in 2010. The score is dedicated to Jack Stamp.
 Mirrors (2009), suite in five movements for piano and orchestra
 commissioned by the Pacific Symphony for Jeffrey Biegel
 Piano Concerto No. 4 – A Hero's Journey (2010), for piano and orchestra
 Commissioned by the Vienna Chamber Orchestra and International Performing Artists Company. Written for Xiayin Wang and Philippe Entremont.
 Across the Span of Time (2011), for orchestra
 Commissioned by the Seattle Symphony
 Darkness in the Ancient Valley (2011), symphony in five movements for solo soprano and orchestra
 Co-commissioned by the Nashville Symphony and the Pittsburgh Symphony
 Vox Humana (2012), premiered in May 2013 in Mannheim, Germany (conductor: Dan Ettinger, NTO Mannheim)
 The Song of the Wandering Darveesh (2012), for orchestra
 Commissioned by the Great Mountains Music Festival, South Korea
 Serenade (2013), for large orchestra
 Commissioned by the Saratoga Performing Arts Center for the Philadelphia Orchestra

Chamber

 "String Quartet No. 1 – Requiem" (1983), for two violins, viola & cello
 Piano Quintet (1988), for string quartet & piano
 Urban Dances (Book 1) (1988), for brass quintet
 Sonnets to Orpheus, Book 1 (1992), for soprano solo, flute, clarinet, horn, piano, percussion & string quintet
 Songs of the Night (1993), for tenor & piano trio
 String Quartet No. 2 – Shadow Dances (1993), for two violins, viola & cello
 Urban Dances, Book 2 (1993), for brass quintet
 Sonnets to Orpheus, Book 2 (1994), for baritone solo, flute, clarinet, horn, piano, percussion & string quintet
 String Quartet No. 3 – Psalms of Sorrow (1994), for baritone solo, two violins, viola & cello
 Fantasy Variations (1997), for cello & piano
 Sweet Talk (1997), for mezzo-soprano, cello, double bass & piano
 Feast of Fools – Concertino (1998), for bassoon & string quartet
 A Child's Reliquary (2000), for piano trio
 As Night Falls on Barjeantane (2000), for violin & piano
 String Quartet No. 4 – Apparitions (2000), two violins, viola & cello
 Portraits (2001), for mezzo-soprano, clarinet, violin, cello & piano
 String Quartet No. 5 – In Search of "La Vita Nuova"  (2004), for two violins, viola & cello
 Troubadour's Feast (2005), for flute, clarinet, violin, viola, cello & piano
 The Book of Hours (2006), for piano quartet
 Benediction (2007), for two horns, two trumpets, three trombones & chimes
 River of Light (2007), for violin & piano
 commissioned by the Isaac and Linda Stern Foundation for violinist Sarah Chang, who premièred the work on March 18, 2007 in La Jolla, CA.
 Kaddish (2008), for violin solo & string septet
 written for Concertante, who premièred the work in Harrisburg, PA on May 15, 2010.
 Remembering Neda (2009), for flute, cello & piano
 written for the Dolce Suono Ensemble, who premièred the work on October 22, 2010 at the Trinity Center for Urban Life in Philadelphia, Pennsylvania.
 String Quartet No. 6 – Addio (2009), for two violins, viola & cello
 commissioned by LifeMusic for the Ying Quartet, who premièred the work at the Hopkins Center, Dartmouth College in Hanover, NH in October 2009.
 The Faces of Guernica (2009), for piano trio
 commissioned by the Walter W. Naumburg Foundation for the Trio Cavatina, who premièred the work at Carnegie Hall, New York in May 2010.
 String Quartet No. 7 – Psalms of Solace  (2014), for two violins, viola, cello, and soprano soloist

Choral

 Oratio Pauli (1982), for S.A.T.B. choir & string orchestra
 Symphony No. 3 – Journey Without Distance (1990), for soprano solo, S.A.T.B. choir & orchestra
 Canticle of Peace (1995), for baritone solo, S.A.T.B. choir & chamber orchestra
 An American Requiem (2001), for mezzo-soprano, tenor, baritone soli, S.A.T.B. choir & orchestra
The Passion of Yeshua (2018), for soprano, mezzo-soprano, tenor, 3 baritone soli, S.A.T.B. choir & orchestra

Vocal

 Symphony No. 2 – Visions (1986), for soprano, tenor soli & orchestra
 Sonnets to Orpheus, Book 1 (1992), for soprano solo & ensemble
 Songs of the Night (1993), for tenor solo & piano trio
 Sonnets to Orpheus, Book 2 (1994), for baritone solo & ensemble
 String Quartet No. 3 – Psalms of Sorrow (1994), for baritone solo & string quartet
 I Am Not Prey (1996), for soprano & piano duet
 Elegies (1997), for mezzo-soprano, baritone soli & orchestra
 Sweet Talk (1997), for mezzo-soprano solo & small ensemble
 Spirits in the Well (1998), for treble solo & piano
 Portraits (2001), for soprano solo & small ensemble
 Songs of Solitude (2004), for baritone solo & orchestra
 Four Arias, from "Margaret Garner" (2005), for baritone & piano
 He Is By, from "Margaret Garner" (2005), for soprano & piano
 Three Arias, from "Margaret Garner" (2005), for mezzo-soprano & piano
 Pastime (2006), for baritone solo & orchestra
 Triptych (2006), for mezzo-soprano & orchestra
 A Woman's Life (2007), for soprano & orchestra
 Three Prayers (2007), for soprano solo & orchestra
 Come Up from the Fields Father (2008) for baritone, viola and piano; words by Walt Whitman
 commissioned by the Curtis Institute, Philadelphia; premièred by Adrian Kramer (baritone), Roberto Díaz (viola) and Mikael Eliasen (piano) at the Curtis Institute on May 15, 2009.
 Songs from an Old War (2009), for baritone & piano
 written for American baritone Thomas Hampson

Solo instrumental

 Psalms (1985), for piano
 Sonata (1986), for piano
 The Enchanted Garden (Preludes, Book 1) (1992), for piano
 Mardi Gras (1992), for piano
 Elegy (2003), for piano
 Three Preludes (2003), for piano
 Piano Fantasy: "Wenn Ich Einmal Soll Schneiden" (2008), for piano
 The Enchanted Garden (Preludes, Book 2) (2009), for piano

Current/recent projects 

Danielpour's current and forthcoming projects includes works for Yo-Yo Ma, the Iris Chamber Orchestra, Baltimore Symphony, Guarneri Quartet, Atlanta Symphony, Nashville Symphony, Music from Copland House, Brooklyn Philharmonic, Seattle Symphony, Singapore Symphony, Orchestre National de Lyon and the WDR Symphony Orchestra, Cologne.

Sources
 G. Schirmer, Biography: Richard Danielpour

References

External links
 

1956 births
Living people
20th-century classical composers
21st-century classical composers
Oberlin College alumni
New England Conservatory alumni
American male classical composers
American classical composers
American people of Iranian descent
American people of Iranian-Jewish descent
Jewish American classical composers
Manhattan School of Music faculty
American opera composers
Male opera composers
Musicians from New York City
Pupils of Vincent Persichetti
21st-century American composers
20th-century American composers
Classical musicians from New York (state)
20th-century American male musicians
21st-century American male musicians
UCLA Herb Alpert School of Music faculty
21st-century American Jews